In disk arrays, a business continuance volume (BCV) is EMC Corporation's term for an independently addressable copy of a data volume, that uses advanced mirroring technique for business continuity purposes.

Use 
BCVs can be detached from the active data storage at a point in time and mounted on non-critical servers to facilitate offline backup or parallel computing. Once offline processes are completed, these BCVs can be either:

 discarded 
 re-attached (re-synchronized) to the production data again 
 used as a source to recover the production data

Types
There are two types of BCVs:

 A clone BCV is a traditional method, and uses one-to-one separate physical storage (splitable disk mirror)
 least impact on production performance
 high cost of the additional storage 
 persistent usage
 A snapshot BCV, that uses copy on write algorithm on the production volume
 uses only a small additional storage, that only holds the changes made to the production volume
 lower cost of the additional storage
 reads and writes impact performance of production storage
 once snapshot storage fills up, the snapshot becomes invalid and unusable
 short-term usage

References

External links
 Analytical Intelligence On The Background Industry With Interviews & Data

Backup software
Business continuity
Dell EMC
Fault-tolerant computer systems